Debra Zimmerman is an American film distributor and lecturer. She has been the Executive Director non-profit media arts organization Women Make Movies since 1983.

Life and career
Zimmerman was born in New York City. In the late 1970s she worked as an intern at Women Make Movies and was then hired by the organization as the Associate Producer and Editor of Why Women Stay, which was directed by Jacqueline Shortell-McSweeney. After working freelance in production, she went to work at the Edna McConnell Clark Foundation as Assistant to Patricia Carry Stewart.

In 1983 she became the Executive Director of Women Make Movies. She has moderated panels and given master classes at the Sundance Film Festival, the Toronto International Film Festival, and Reel Screen. She lectures regularly on women filmmakers and independent film at various universities, including the New School for Social Research, the University of Texas at Austin, UCLA, Harvard University and Smith College. She has keynoted conferences on women’s cinema at SUNY Stony Brook and University of Sunderland, England.

Zimmerman served on the juries of various film festivals, including the Abu Dhabi Film Festival, International Documentary Film Festival Amsterdam, the Cartagena Film Festival and One World Film Festival. she held the Laurie Chair in Women's Studies at the Douglass College and Rutgers University in 2014-15. She was author of a Chapter, Film as activism and transformative praxis: Women Make Movies in the book, The Routledge Companion to Cinema & Gender. She is also a member of the Board of Directors of Cinema Tropical.

Awards and honors
 2018 - Honorary Maverick Award, Female Eye Film Festival
 2013 - Doc Mogul Award at the Hot Docs Canadian International Documentary Festival
 2012 - Loreen Arbus Award, New York Women in Film & Television
 2011 - The Laura Ziskin Lifetime Achievement Award, Athena Film Festival
 2009 - Elizabeth Cady Stanton Award, High Falls Film Festival

References

External links
 

Year of birth missing (living people)
Living people
Lecturers
People from New York City
American women academics